Riverglen is a satellite locality of Murray Bridge in South Australia on the west bank of the Murray River adjacent to Swanport and overlooking the east bank locality of Monteith. The locality was named after the Riverglen Irrigation Area in March 2000.

See also
 List of cities and towns in South Australia

References 

Towns in South Australia